Georgetown is an unincorporated community in Gibson Township, Washington County, in the U.S. state of Indiana.

Geography

References

Unincorporated communities in Washington County, Indiana
Unincorporated communities in Indiana